Tasha Schwikert Warren (born November 21, 1984) is a retired American gymnast who is a 2000 Olympic bronze medalist, a World Gymnastics Championships team gold medalist, the 2001 and 2002 U.S. senior national all-around champion and the 2005 and 2008 NCAA all-around national champion.

Schwikert began gymnastics at a young age and rose through the ranks to the elite level in the sport in the mid-90s. She was a surprise member of the 2000 Olympic squad, but performed well in both the team preliminaries and finals in Sydney. Following the Olympics, she became one of the most prominent gymnasts in the United States, winning two team medals at the World Championships and placing fifth in the all-around at the 2001 Worlds. An ankle injury impeded her progress and left her named as an alternate on the 2004 Olympic team.

Following her elite career, Schwikert spent four years as a member of the UCLA Bruins gymnastics team. During her time with the Bruins she won two individual all-around NCAA national champion titles and two Pac-10 all-around titles, and was nominated for the Honda Award. She is currently pursuing a career in broadcast journalism, and has already been employed as a commentator at several major gymnastics events.

Early life and career to 2000
The daughter of Shannon Warren and Joy Schwikert, Schwikert was born in Las Vegas, Nevada. She trained with coach Cassie Rice at GymCats club in Las Vegas, and was a member of USA Gymnastics' TOPS developmental team in 1994 and 1995. At the age of thirteen, in 1998, she earned her first national team berth. Her first international meet was the 1998 City of Popes competition in France, where she won a silver medal on the floor exercise in the junior division.

Schwikert first came to prominence as a member of the U.S. team for the 2000 Olympics in Sydney. Her presence on the team was controversial: she placed ninth at the Olympic Trials, was not originally named to the team at all, and joined the squad in Sydney later as a second alternate. When team member Morgan White was injured in training, Schwikert was named as her replacement, passing over first the reserve Alyssa Beckerman.  Despite the questions over Schwikert's qualification, she performed strongly under pressure while some of her more illustrious teammates made mistakes. Following the Olympics, Schwikert would become arguably the most visible and noteworthy gymnast in America.

USA Gymnastics Online, in their article "Tasha Schwikert Added as Second Alternate to 2000 U.S. Olympic Team", reported on August 28, 2000:
"Tasha Schwikert (Las Vegas, Nev.), 15, has been added as second alternate to the 2000 U.S. Olympic Team. The decision to name Schwikert as an alternate was made Friday following a conference call with the selection committee. The selection procedures allow for two alternates to the Olympic Team. Alyssa Beckerman (Wyoming, Ohio) is the first alternate. 'Tasha has demonstrated a great deal of consistency this year in both domestic and international competition', said Bob Colarossi, President of USA Gymnastics. 'Her poise and performances are considered to be very reliable and her desire to support this team is a valuable asset to the group.' Schwikert had competed in seven competitions in 2000 prior to the Olympic Trials, including all three events in the Visa American Cup Series in January and February. She was also a member of the 2000 U.S. Spieth Sogipa team that won a team gold medal in April. She is coached by Cassie Rice at GymCats in Las Vegas." 

On April 28, 2010, Tasha and the other women on the 2000 Olympic team were awarded the bronze medal in the team competition when it was discovered that the previous medal winners, the Chinese team, had falsified the age of team member Dong Fangxiao. As a result of the falsification, Dong's results were nullified, and the Chinese team was stripped of the medal by the IOC.

Career from 2001
Schwikert was the only member of the 2000 team to continue competing at the elite level after the Olympics. Sporting a new floor exercise routine and upgraded skills on balance beam and bars, she won the all-around titles at the 2001 U.S. Championships, the American Classic and the Pan American Championships. She participated in the 2001 World Artistic Gymnastics Championships in Ghent, where she led the U.S. team to a surprise bronze medal and was the USA's highest finisher in the all-around, placing fifth.  She qualified for the floor exercise and balance beam event finals. A medal was a possibility in the floor finals (her all around score on this apparatus would have been high enough for bronze) but she fell on her final tumbling pass.

In 2002 Schwikert won the all-around titles at the Pacific Alliance and the American Cup, as well as her second U.S. Championships. However, in the fall of 2002, injuries prevented her from competing in the 2002 World Championships.

Schwikert tied for second at the 2003 U.S. Nationals. She was the captain of the 2003 World Artistic Gymnastics Championships team in Anaheim, supporting her younger teammates throughout the competition and demonstrating leadership and good sportsmanship.  In the team finals, she only competed on vault and uneven bars but performed both of her routines cleanly, posting the highest score of the American team on the vault and second highest score on the uneven bars. Her scores helped the American women win their first team gold medal in World Championships competition.

Also in 2003, Schwikert traveled to Japan to compete in the third iteration of the Kunoichi television series (known as "Women of Ninja Warrior" in the United States).  She made it to the end of the second stage, but failed to finish within the time limit. A slip on the wall climb obstacle cost her valuable time, and her time expired when she was just inches from the buzzer.

At the 2004 U.S. Championships, still struggling with injuries, Schwikert won the uneven bars title but placed off the all-around podium for the first time since 2000. She was named as an alternate to the 2004 Olympic team and flew to Athens with her two fellow reserves, Chellsie Memmel and Allyse Ishino, but was not called upon to compete.

College career
From 2004 to 2008, Schwikert was a member of the UCLA Bruins gymnastics team, competing on a full athletic scholarship.  Schwikert's younger sister, Jordan, was also a Bruin. She and Tasha opted to enter UCLA at the same time, and thus were in the same graduating class.

In Schwikert's first year of competition for the UCLA Bruins gymnastics team, she won the NCAA National all-around title. She was the only gymnast in 2005 to earn first-team All-American honors on all four events.  Schwikert was sidelined for most of the 2005–2006 season due to a shoulder injury requiring surgery, but remained a student at UCLA and a member of the team. Schwikert returned to the UCLA floor and vault lineup for the Pac-10 Championships in late March, and continued to compete on a limited basis for the rest of the season. While UCLA did not qualify for the 2006 NCAA Nationals as a team, Schwikert qualified as an individual and competed on vault, finishing eleventh in the preliminary round.

Recovered from her injury, Schwikert ended the 2006–2007 season as one of the top collegiate gymnasts in the nation. She won the PAC-10 all-around title for the second time in her career, picking up additional gold medals on the floor exercise, balance beam and vault, and was named the PAC-10 and West Region Gymnast of the Year. She also won the all-around title at the NCAA Southeast Regional Championships. At the NCAA Women's Gymnastics championship in April, Schwikert was the only gymnast from UCLA to win an individual award, earning second on the uneven bars. She was the only gymnast in the nation to rank in the Top 15 on all four individual events, as well as the all-around, and was a nominee for the Honda Award.

Schwikert completed her senior year as one of the strongest gymnasts on the Bruins team. At the 2008 NCAA National Championships, she won her second all-around title and placed first on uneven bars, second on floor, and eighth on vault.

Current activities
Since 2005, Schwikert has been employed as a gymnastics commentator by the WCSN Network. She has covered the World Gymnastics Championships for three consecutive years, working alongside Nadia Comăneci (2005) and Bart Conner. Schwikert has also commentated on UCLA gymnastics broadcasts, and worked with NBC at the Beijing Olympics.

Schwikert has worked on the television series Make It or Break It as both a stunt double and actress.

Schwikert graduated from University of Nevada, Las Vegas – William S. Boyd School of Law in May 2015 and currently works as an attorney at the Las Vegas office of Holland & Hart LLP.

Personal life
Schwikert married professional basketball player Mike Moser in 2015. They have a daughter born in 2015.

List of major honors, accomplishments, and titles
2008 NCAA Championships: 1st AA, UB; 2nd FX
2008 Pac-10 Championships: 1st UB
2008 NCAA Southeast Regional Championships: 3rd VT
2007 NCAA Championships: 2nd UB
2007 Pac-10 Championships: 1st AA
2007 NCAA Southeast Regional Championships: 1st AA
2005 NCAA Championships: 1st AA
2005 Pac-10 Championships: 1st AA
2005 West Regional Championships: 1st AA
2004 US National Championships: 1st UB; 4th FX (tie)
2003 World Championships: 1st team
2003 US National Championships: 2nd AA (tie)
2002 Pacific Alliance Championships: 1st team, AA, BB, FX; 2nd UB
2002 US National Championships: 1st AA, UB, FX; 2nd BB
2002 American Cup: 1st AA
2002 American Classic: 1st AA, UB, BB, FX
2001 World Championships: 3rd team; 5th AA
2001 Senior Pan American Championships: 1st team, AA, UB; 2nd FX, BB, VT
2001 U.S. National Championships: 1st AA, BB; 2nd FX, VT (tie); 3rd UB
2001 U.S. Classic: 1st AA, FX; 2nd VT (tie), BB; 3rd UB
2000 Olympic Games: 3rd team
2000 Spieth Sogipa: 1st team; 2nd AA
1999 World Team Trials: 7th AA
1999 China Dual Meet: 1st team
1998 City of Popes: 2nd FX (jr)

Key: AA (all-around); BB (balance beam); FX (floor exercise); VT (vault) ; UB (Uneven Bars)

Sources

References

External links
 

1984 births
African-American female gymnasts
American female artistic gymnasts
Gymnasts at the 2000 Summer Olympics
Living people
Medalists at the 2000 Summer Olympics
Medalists at the World Artistic Gymnastics Championships
Olympic bronze medalists for the United States in gymnastics
Sportspeople from Las Vegas
UCLA Bruins women's gymnasts
NCAA gymnasts who have scored a perfect 10
U.S. women's national team gymnasts
21st-century African-American sportspeople
21st-century African-American women
20th-century African-American people
20th-century African-American women